Meggenhorn Castle is a  castle in Meggen near the Swiss city of Lucerne. It was built in 1868/70 by Edouad Hofer-Grosjean from Mulhouse and in 1926 equipped with a Welte Philharmonic Organ. It is surrounded by vineyards and is considered to be the municipality's symbol. Today, it is mostly used as a tourist attraction and reception venue.  It is a Swiss heritage site of national significance.

Meggenhorn is served by a landing stage on Lake Lucerne that is some  walk from the castle. On weekends and some other days, the Lake Lucerne Navigation Company operate several return sailings between the Bahnhofquai, adjacent to Lucerne station, and Meggenhorn.

See also
 List of castles in Switzerland

References

External links
 Short description (German)
 Images of the Schloss Meggenhorn (German and/or French)

Cultural property of national significance in the canton of Lucerne
Castles in the canton of Lucerne
Museums in Lucerne
Historic house museums in Switzerland